Culture Machine is a peer-reviewed open access academic journal of culture and theory that was established in 1999. It is published by Open Humanities Press.

Further reading
 Gary Hall, Culture in bits: the monstrous future of theory, Continuum International Publishing Group, 2002,

External links
 

Annual journals
Publications established in 1999
Cultural journals
Open access journals
English-language journals
Open Humanities Press academic journals